Wallace Eugene Wingert (born May 6, 1961) is an American actor and former DJ. His roles include Almighty Tallest Red in Invader Zim, Renji Abarai in Bleach, Kotetsu T. Kaburagi / Wild Tiger in Tiger & Bunny, The Riddler in the Batman: Arkham series, the mascot of H.H. Gregg and Jon Arbuckle in The Garfield Show.

Early life
Wingert was born in Des Moines, Iowa on May 6, 1961, but soon moved to Sioux Falls, South Dakota.

Career
He began his career in radio as a disc jockey in 1977, at the age of 16 years old. He eventually moved to Los Angeles, California in 1987, continuing his radio career.

In 1989, Wingert parodied the Escape Club song "Wild, Wild West" on the Dr. Demento radio show as "Adam West", in response to the casting of Michael Keaton as the titular character for Batman. He continued to work with the radio business with Westwood One, but later left the station and would take a full-time position as an air personality with KTWV. After five years, he eventually left the radio station and would pursue a career in acting and voice acting. Following Kevin Conroy's passing in November 2022, Wingert posted a heartfelt story on how he cited his meeting with Conroy as a major influence on his career.

Wingert was the announcer for the second incarnation of The Tonight Show with Jay Leno (and its spin-off The Jay Leno Show) as well as the voice of Jon Arbuckle from The Garfield Show. He is also known for his roles as Almighty Tallest Red from Invader Zim (opposite Kevin McDonald), Ant-Man / Giant-Man from The Avengers: Earth's Mightiest Heroes, the Riddler from the Batman: Arkham series, Renji Abarai from Bleach and Kotetsu T. Kaburagi / Wild Tiger from Tiger & Bunny.

He narrated Impact: Stories of Survival on the Discovery Health Channel, How to Build Everything on the Science Channel, Amazing Medical Stories and That's Gotta Hurt on TLC, some episodes of E! True Hollywood Story on E! and Outdoor Outtakes on the Outdoor Life Network.

Personal life
Wingert currently resides in Palm Springs, California. In his spare time, he enjoys collecting animation art, autographs, drawings, movie and television costumes, collectible toys and rock and roll merchandise.

Filmography

Live-action

Film

Television

Web

Voice roles

Film

Anime

Animation

Video games

Commercials
 H. H. Gregg (2008–2012) - HH (voice)

References

External links

 
 
 

1961 births
Living people
American male video game actors
American male voice actors
Male actors from Des Moines, Iowa
People from Sioux Falls, South Dakota
20th-century American male actors
21st-century American male actors